So schön anders is the second studio album by German singer Adel Tawil. It was released on 21 April 2017 by Polydor and Island Records.

Track listing

Charts

Weekly charts

Year-end charts

Certifications and sales

References

External links
 Adel-Tawil.de — official site

2017 albums